refers to the economic policies implemented by the Government of Japan led by the Liberal Democratic Party (LDP) since the December 2012 general election. They are named after Shinzō Abe, who served a second stint as Prime Minister of Japan from 2012 to 2020. Abe was the longest-serving prime minister in Japanese history. After Abe resigned in September 2020, his successor, Yoshihide Suga, has stated that his premiership will focus on continuing the policies and goals of the Abe administration, including the Abenomics suite of economic policies.

Abenomics is based upon "three arrows:" monetary easing from the Bank of Japan, fiscal stimulus through government spending, and structural reforms. The Economist characterized the program as a "mix of reflation, government spending and a growth strategy designed to jolt the economy out of suspended animation that has gripped it for more than two decades".

During Abe's tenure, the rate of Japan's nominal GDP growth was higher, and the ratio of government debt relative to national income stabilized for the first time in decades. However, the "third arrow" of structural reforms was not as effective as observers had hoped.

The term Abenomics is a portmanteau of Abe and economics, and follows other political neologisms for economic policies linked to specific leaders such as Bidenomics, Clintonomics, Obamanomics, Reaganomics and Rogernomics.

Background

Japanese economic conditions prior to Abenomics 

In 1996 GDP increased by 3 percent, promising recovery from the bursting of a major asset-price bubble in the early 1990s. The Japanese government raised the consumption tax from 3% to 5% in April 1997, with the view to further increases in 1998.

There was a Financial Crisis in East and South East Asia, following the collapse of the Thai Baht peg on July 2, 1997, which had widespread consequences in the entire region. Government revenues subsequently decreased by 4.5 trillion yen as consumption faltered. Nominal GDP growth remained below zero for most of the five years following the tax hike. Japan's average annual wages grew between 1992 and 1997, but began declining after the 1997 tax hike. Since 1997, wages have decreased faster than nominal GDP.

In 2012, the Diet of Japan under previous Prime Minister Yoshihiko Noda passed a bill to increase the consumption tax to 8% in 2014 and 10% in 2015 in order to balance the national budget; this tax hike was expected to further discourage consumption.

World economic conditions prior to Abenomics 
During the global economic recession, Japan suffered a 0.7% loss in real GDP in 2008 followed by a severe 5.2% loss in 2009. In contrast, the data for world real GDP growth was a 3.1% hike in 2008 followed by a 0.7% loss in 2009. Exports from Japan shrank from 746.5 billion in U.S. dollars to 545.3 billion in U.S. dollars from 2008 to 2009, a 27% reduction. By 2013, nominal GDP in Japan was at the same level as 1991 while the Nikkei 225 stock market index was at a third of its peak.

Ideological basis of Abenomics 

Abe's economic policy is also related to the rise of China as an economic and political power. Abe's supporters drew explicit parallels between Abenomics and the Meiji era program of fukoku kyohei (enrich the country, strengthen the army). In addition to providing a stronger counterweight to China in the Asia-Pacific region, strengthening the Japanese economy is also intended to make Japan less reliant on the United States for defense.

Note: NGDP is valued at 2006 market prices

Implementation

Abenomics consists of monetary policy, fiscal policy, and economic growth strategies to encourage private investment. Specific policies include inflation targeting at a 2% annual rate, correction of the excessive yen appreciation, setting negative interest rates, radical quantitative easing, expansion of public investment, buying operations of construction bonds by Bank of Japan (BOJ), and revision of the Bank of Japan Act. Fiscal spending will increase by 2% of GDP, likely raising the deficit to 11.5% of GDP for 2013.

Two of the "three arrows" were implemented in the first weeks of Abe's government. Abe quickly announced a ¥10.3 trillion stimulus bill, and appointed Haruhiko Kuroda to head the Bank of Japan with a mandate to generate a 2 percent target inflation rate through quantitative easing. But Kikuo Iwata, the deputy governor of Bank of Japan, suggested that BoJ does not strictly aim for the 2 percent price target in two years. Iwata implied that BoJ would not loosen again its monetary policy, aimed at halting economic stagnation, soon after the increase in the sales tax in April 2014.

Structural reforms have taken more time to implement, although Abe made some early moves on this front such as pushing for Japanese participation in the Trans-Pacific Partnership.

The mid-2013 House of Councillors election gave Abe complete control over the Diet, but the government showed some internal division over specific structural reforms. Certain cabinet members favored lower corporate taxes, while others were wary of the potential political backlash for cutting taxes on large firms while raising taxes on consumers. Labor laws and rice production controls have also become contentious issues within Abe's government.

Quantitative Easing

On 4 April 2013, the BoJ announced its quantitative easing program, whereby it would buy ¥60 to ¥70 trillion of bonds a year.

On 31 October 2014, the BoJ announced the expansion of its bond buying program, to now buy ¥80 trillion of bonds a year.

Effects

Abenomics had immediate effects on various financial markets in Japan. By February 2013, the Abenomics policy led to a dramatic weakening of the Japanese yen and a 22% rise in the TOPIX stock market index.  The unemployment rate in Japan fell from 4.0% in the final quarter of 2012 to 3.7% in the first quarter of 2013, continuing a past trend.

The yen became about 25% lower against the U.S. dollar in the second quarter of 2013 compared to the same period in 2012, with a highly loose monetary policy being followed. By May 2013, the stock market had risen by 55 percent, consumer spending had pushed first quarter economic growth up 3.5 percent annually, and Shinzo Abe's approval rating ticked up to 70 percent. A Nihon Keizai Shimbun survey found that 74% of the respondents praised the policy in alleviating Japan from the prolonged recession.

The impact on wages and consumer sentiment was more muted. A Kyodo News poll in January 2014 found that 73% of Japanese respondents had not personally noticed the effects of Abenomics, only 28 percent expected to see a pay raise, and nearly 70% were considering cutting back spending following the increase in the consumption tax.

Under a weaker Yen, Abenomics increased the cost of imports, including food, oil and other natural resources upon which Japan is highly reliant. However, the Abe government viewed this as a temporary setback, as the weaker yen would eventually increase export volumes. Japan also managed to maintain an overall current account surplus due to investment income from overseas. In December 2018, however, it was confirmed that the Japanese economy started contracting in the third quarter of 2018 and declined the most in four years during this quarter as well.

Analysis

Austerity policies
BMI Research expressed the view that the Japanese economy would fall into fiscal crisis before 2020 due to basic structural issues including high government debt, worsening demographics, and loss of competitiveness in key industries. Anatole Kaletsky was an early supporter of Abenomics, but since the Japanese government decided to raise the country's consumption tax rate to 10 percent, he expressed his concern that the tax hike could deal a more devastating blow to Japanese economy than expected. In 1997, the Japanese government raised the rate to 5 percent from 3 percent to tackle its debt of 50 percent of its GDP at that time, promising that the tax hike would be offset by income-tax reforms. But the tax hike ended up making the domestic consumption stumble, pushing the economy into recession. The country fell into a deflationary trap. Due to the country's long-running malaise, the government gross debt reached 200 percent of its GDP despite the increase of the sales tax. The IMF forecast that the tax hike in 2014 would cut Japan's economic growth from 2.5 percent in 2013 to 1.4 percent in 2014, but Kaletsky argues that this economic downturn is underestimated.

In March 2014, at a conference in Abu Dhabi, Lawrence Summers expressed his concern about the negative effects of the tax hike, saying that the tax hike could damage the Japanese economy more seriously than early estimates. Although the Japanese government expects the Japanese economy to recover after the economy goes into short recession, Summers suggested that Japan's rebound was overestimated.

Koichi Hamada, a monetary adviser for Shinzo Abe, warned that the planned VAT hike could hurt Japan's economy which started to recover from long recession and deflation. He says that the Japan government should defer the tax hike so that it could not discourage consumption, adding that economists such as Jeffrey Frankel have suggested the gradual increase of the rate of the tax by one percent annually. Although Hamada is concerned about the effects of the tax hike, he expects that monetary easing by BoJ can offset its negative effects, applying the Mundell–Fleming model to Japan.

Depreciating a domestic currency can boost its export if the Marshall–Lerner condition is met. If it is not, the trade balance initially becomes worse.

Since the disastrous nuclear incident in Fukushima in 2011, many nuclear power stations in Japan have been shut down. Making up for lost electricity generation, Japan has imported extra fossil fuels, which worsened the country's trade deficit partly because of weaker yen. The increasing cost of electricity may hurt businesses in the country, and hamper the country from boosting its economy. But Shigeru Ishiba said that people were noticing that electricity could be supplied without nuclear power generation. Thus, restarting the reactors is still controversial: a nationwide poll showed that 76 percent either opposed nuclear power or wanted Japan to reduce the reliance on nuclear energy, while in some regions such as communities close to Sendai city, where nuclear power plants create jobs and relating subsidies are granted, restarting the reactors is widely supported. Unless nuclear reactors are restarted, the Marshall–Lerner condition will not be met due to a heavier dependence on fossil fuels and an increased reliance on imports.

Deflation
Martin Feldstein argued that consumption would be damaged by monetary ease policy by national bank, when the rise in prices higher than the rise in wage.

Deflation causes consumers to expect goods and services to be cheaper in the future, discouraging present spending. In turn, this causes the economy to shrink, as consumer spending is vital. Richard Koo explained this phenomenon as fallacy of composition, that is to say that while correct behaviour is desirable individually, it can cause undesirable consequences on the economy as a whole.

Richard Koo opposed the idea that Japan's aging population and decreasing labour force caused Japan to suffer from chronic deflation. Population aging leads to a situation where the number of people (including retired people) who spend money becomes larger than that of people who work. In other words, demand should tend to exceed supply, and therefore population ageing should be inflationary.

He goes on to explain what actually has occurred in Japan. Japanese companies are unwilling to borrow money and pay interest that the elderly obtain, which may discourage the elderly to spend. Thus, Japan's tenacious deflation has been caused by the weak demand.

Japan's nominal output has decreased by more than $1 trillion due to falling land prices and equity since 1990. Richard Koo said that in human history Japan was the only country suffering such a loss during peacetime. In a 2003 speech in Tokyo, Ben Bernanke suggested that the Bank of Japan should implement quantitative easing in order to put an end to the deflation spiral. 5 years after his speech, Bernanke started quantitative easing as chair of the Federal Reserve, to fend off a Japanese-like lost decade due to a bubble in housing prices. The US central bank has since then bought financial assets like bank debt, mortgage backed securities and US government bonds. This amounted to nearly US$4.5 trillion by 2015.

Japanese wages began to decrease from 1997 to 1998, and Hiroshi Yoshikawa, a professor at University of Tokyo, said that Japan's tenacious deflation was caused by this decline. He argues that the monetary easing by BoJ becomes powerless because the interest rate is already close to zero. The solution he offers to beating the deflation is to push companies to pay their workers more. Kikuo Iwata, Etsuro Honda and Koichi Hamada disagreed with Yoshikawa. Hamada said if the wages just increased, companies would become incapable of maintaining current level of employment.

Debate

Consumption Tax increase

Support
LDP Secretary General Sadakazu Tanigaki held that it was difficult to cope with risks stemming from sidestepping the planned consumption tax hike to 10 percent, suggesting that the Japanese government should increase the tax rate as scheduled.

Haruhiko Kuroda, the governor of Bank of Japan, said that raising Japan's consumption tax is a confidence-building measure and the measure could stabilize the social security which would strengthen Japan's economic growth. He stated that the stagnation due to the tax hike would be temporary, while he mentioned the possible scenario in which BoJ would additionally conduct quantitative easing. He warned that the cut of its corporation tax could worsen its fiscal position.

BoJ governor Kuroda argued that if the second hike was delayed, the markets would perceive that Japan is unlikely to tackle its government debt, and then the yields of the government bonds would soar. BoJ's former deputy governor Kazumasa Iwata said that if the second hike was put off, the hike could be permanently postponed, and it would become difficult to reach a new agreement on the schedule of the hike. He said that implementing stimulative measures was the only way to alleviate the tax hike's negative impact.

Hiroshi Yoshikawa is one of the strong supporters of the consumption tax hike to 10 per cent; he maintains that there is no alternative.

Criticism
One BoJ board member expressed concern over the planned tax-hike set to take effect in 2014 and 2015.

Paul Krugman said that the consumption tax hike from 5 percent to 8 percent raised serious doubt about Japan's economic recovery, and that in order to lift the economy, the government should decrease the VAT to 5 percent and work to build up inflation expectations.

Lawrence Summers supported the view that the Japanese government should postpone the planned tax hike, suggesting that a steady economic growth should be more important for the country than fiscal discipline.  
He says that if its economic growth accelerates, the world-third-largest economy can tame its government debt. He says that fiscal policy is much more effective than monetary policy, because the former can inject income directly into the spending stream.

When Summers was the US Deputy Secretary of the Treasury, he told the Japanese government not to raise the consumption tax rate from 3% to 5%. But the government ignored his warnings, and raised the tax in 1997 for the purpose of balancing its budget. Although the country recorded a GDP growth rate of 3 percent in 1996, the economy sank into recession in 1998. On top of that, the revenue of the government decreased by 4.5 trillion yen in 1998 mainly because Japan's domestic consumption stumbled. Graph A shows the revenue of the Japanese government during 1994–2006. The tax revenue reached a peak of 53 trillion yen in FY 1997, and declined in subsequent years, being still 42 trillion yen (US$537 billion) in 2012.  
    
Joseph Stiglitz said that Japan's economy was still fragile, and the planned consumption tax hike from 5% to 8% would plunge it into recession.

Demand management

Support
The International Monetary Fund characterized the program as "a unique opportunity to end decades-long deflation and sluggish growth and reverse the rise of public debt," but argued that "all three arrows need to be launched for the policies to succeed. Uncertainty about the ambition of fiscal and structural reforms is adding to underlying risks."

Economist Joseph Stiglitz has explained how Shinzo Abe's programme for Japan's economic recovery has led to a surge in domestic confidence, and questioned how far Abe's "Abenomics" could claim credit. He referenced Momcilo Stanic, saying there is every reason to believe that Japan's strategy to revive and boost its economy will be a success.

The Washington Post journalist Neil Irwin cited successful expansion by Toyota, with operating profit rising 88 percent in the second quarter of 2013, as evidence that the economic program of Japan is working. He has stated that "the fact that one of Japan's biggest and most important companies is again finding ways to make money on the homefront is a good sign that the nation's economic torpor may not last too much longer." He has also argued that Abenomics could "change the economic psychology of Japan domestically" by providing export hikes through currency devaluation.

Criticism
In addition, there is rising skepticism regarding Abenomics, pointing out that the policy is too focused on demand rather than on supply, such as the case of the Japanese government's push for generic medicines within its Universal Healthcare System without actually addressing the root causes. One of the fundamental problems that Japan is facing is its aging population. As the population pyramid becomes inverted, the labor pool shrinks from year to year. This brings about a number of problems for the Japanese economy.

First, the government commitment in spending on pensions, medical expenses and social security will continually act as a substantial burden to the already indebted country with a public debt of 240% its GDP. This will further worsen the financial integrity of the Japanese government leading to an erosion of international confidence in Japanese economy. The lack of confidence can raise the risk premium (CDS).

Secondly, its dwindling workforce cannot sustain the economic output level that is maintained in the future. The Japanese demography will drastically change so that more young people will have to support for the older population, which implies that this change in demography is the main culprit for the last two decades of deflation and stagnant economic growth. This has another implication to why the consumer demand might be falling behind.

Goldman Sachs chief economist Naohiko Baba has criticized the infrastructure spending component of Abenomics, arguing that the Japanese construction industry is inefficient and short of workers.

In January 2013, German Chancellor Angela Merkel said that the German people believed that central banks should not make up for bad political decisions, and she criticised Japan and US of their expansionary monetary policies to enhance their competitiveness. Bundesbank chief Jens Weidmann accused the Japanese government of politicising exchange rates and threatening the independence of the central bank. The European Central Bank launched quantitative easing programmes of its own two years later.

Tax cuts for the rich

Support
Koichi Hamada countered the criticism that only big firms and the rich benefitted from Abenomics, saying that it had a trickle-down effect on rest of the economy. He said that Japan needed to lower corporate taxes from about 35% (current level) to 24% to attract investment.

Criticism
Thomas Piketty said that Japan needed to change the structure of its taxation in order to help the Japanese young generation, suggesting that the world's third largest economy should increase taxes on the wealthy and big firms from 10% to 20%. He took the view that redistribution of wealth could be the fourth arrow of Abenomics. He added that raising VAT was a bad way to reduce inequality in the country. The top rate of income tax in Japan is 52% (not 10%) and the rate of corporation tax in Japan is about 23%, plus about 4% local corporation tax.

Joseph Stiglitz suggests that even if tax cuts for the rich are done in US or UK, big firms just try to use them for their personal gains, not for raising wages of their employees.

Results
There is no formal estimation of the results of Abenomics by the Japanese government.

GDP
IMF affirmed that Japan's nominal GDP contracted by $1.8 trillion during 2012–2015 while real GDP contracted at an annual rate of 6.8 percent in the second quarter of 2014, after the Consumption Tax hike came into effect in April. This fall is the worst since the devastating earthquake and tsunami disaster hit Japan in the first quarter of 2011 when the GDP shrank by an annualised 6.9 percent. In the third quarter of 2014, the GDP shrank by an additional 1.6 percent, largely thanks to the consumption tax hike. The tax hike to 8 percent has had a significantly negative impact on the Japanese economy. In 2014, the revised real GDP growth of the second quarter was minus 7.1 percent on an annualised basis, contrary to economists' expectation that the economy would shrink at an annual rate of 3.5 percent in the second quarter.

Household spending fell 5.9 percent in July 2014 from the same month a year earlier, more than the median forecast of economists polled by Reuters of a 3 percent drop, because of the higher consumption tax.     

Economics minister Akira Amari said that the Japanese government would take necessary measures, depending on its economic condition, although he at the moment did not feel that those measures needed to be done. Amari expressed confidence that the effect of the consumption tax hike began to wear off and the economy would recover later in 2014.

Kyohei Morita and Yuichiro Nagai said that they believed that Japan's real GDP would return to growth exceeding potential, mentioning economic indicators such as public works and housing construction orders.

Economists' forecast said that the Japanese economy would grow by annualised 2 percent in the third quarter of 2014, but in reality the country's GDP contracted at an annual rate of 1.6 percent in the quarter. Japan's second consecutive contraction meant that technically the third largest economy slipped into recession.
Revised figures said that Japan's GDP shrank at an annual rate of 1.9 percent in the third quarter of 2014, which is 0.5 percent contraction on a quarterly basis. The consumption tax hike in April continued to have a negative impact on its economy.
Business spending decreased by 0.4 percent from the previous quarter. Abe determined to call for a snap election to win a mandate to delay the second tax hike which was scheduled to be done in 2015.

Akira Amari, however, said that there was a positive ongoing cycle in the economy and they could not sum it all up with the word recession, conceding that the consumption tax hike in April 2014 dented consumer spending.

The following figure compares the 1996-1999 period with the 2013-2015 period, in terms of Japan's real GDP. During the 1996-1999 period, the consumption tax was raised from 3 to 5 per cent, and during the 2013-2015 period, the same tax was raised from 5% to 8%. For the 1996-1999 period, the GDP of the first quarter of 1996 is set 100. For the 2013-2015 period, that of Q1 of 2013 is 100. The interval of the horizontal axis is one quarter, and the quarters when the consumption tax were raised are set zero. And therefore, the GDPs of Q1 1996 and of Q1 2013 correspond to values evaluated at quarter -5. 

In the first quarter of 2015, Japan's economy grew by 0.6 per cent on a quarterly basis. Increase of inventories helped the economy to expand, and the momentum can be lost in the second quarter. This suggests that the consumption tax hike from 5 to 8 per cent continues to have a negative effect on the economy.

OECD reports that Japan's real GDP is expected to expand by 0.7 per cent in 2015. This growth rate is lower than US's 2.0 and UK's 2.4.

In the third quarter of 2015 the Japanese economy contracted 0.8 percent in annual terms and went into a technical recession as the real GDP shrank for two quarters consecutively. The GDP figure was worse than economists' forecast that it would contract by around 0.2 per cent in the third quarter. This recession was its fifth recession since the Lehman shock occurred in 2008. But Amari seemed to be optimistic about the future of Abenomics, indicating that this technical recession would be temporary and the economy was showing signs of continuous and gentle recovery.

Doubts cast regarding the accuracy of data
In 2021,the authenticity of Japan's GDP as a result of Abenomics was questioned after it was revealed that the Japanese government overstated construction orders data for years under the Abe government, a move that would effectively have inflated the Japanese GDP. There was evidence of double counting in the construction data.

Trade balance
As external demand on Japan's goods declines, Japan's export fell 2.7 percent in May 2014 from a year ago. But its imports fell by 3.6 percent from a year ago as well, which narrowed Japan's trade deficit by 8.3 percent. The Japan trade deficit with other countries was over 1 trillion yen in April 2014, and it went down to 909bn yen ($8.9bn, £5.2bn) in May 2014. But the country is still running a trade deficit for the 23rd straight month.

Inflation targeting
In late January 2015, BoJ governor Haruhiko Kuroda admitted that the central bank would not achieve the 2 per cent inflation target by April 2015, adding that he expected the price level to get to the target level in another 12 months. In February 2015, he said that the escape velocity to lift the economy out of tenacious deflation needed to be tremendous. Although in 2013 he pledged to meet the target, the actual core CPI was 0.7 per cent in January 2015.  Oil prices were about US$100 in April 2014, and then they decreased about 50 per cent by the end of 2014. He maintained that the decline in oil prices made it difficult for BoJ to meet the target.

GDP deflator
Abenomics aimed at ending the deflation which continued for more than 15 years, focusing on massive monetary stimulus to build up self-sustaining expectations of moderate inflation. But the expectations were dulled by the consumption tax hike, and the country eventually fell back into deflation: the growth rate of GDP deflator was minus 0.3 percent in the third quarter of 2014.

Labour market 
As of 2019 Japan's unemployment rate was the lowest in the G7. Its employment rate for the working-age population (15-64) was the highest in the G7.

Impacts on the world economy
In the early October 2014, the IMF revised its 2014 global growth forecast downwards from 3.4 percent to 3.3 percent, although many central banks continued to provide liquidity to the world financial market. Weaker expansions in Japan, Latin America and Europe worsened the outlook for the world economy.

In October 2014 the World Bank's chief economist Kaushik Basu said that the world economy was taking the risk of stagnation, adding that Eurozone and Japan were the main slowdown areas.

The Eurozone has been brought to the verge of recession. Italy has suffered from recession for a long time, and France is forced to balance its budget by Germany despite the fact that its economy is depressed. Germany's economy is likely to contract for the second consecutive quarter in 2014.

Japan, the world's third largest economy, can be likely to sink into recession due to the consumption tax hike. Although the IMF's previous forecast assumed that Japan would grow 1.6 percent in 2014, the forecast was revised downwards to 0.9 percent.

Regarding the impact upon the US economy, officials of the Federal Reserve Bank, including its second-in-command, said that global stagnation could cause the Federal Reserve Bank to be forced to postpone the planned interest rate hike. US Treasury Secretary Jacob Lew rejected the idea that the US alone could boost the world economy.

Issues
The Abe administration was supposed to increase the government expenditure, but the Ministry of Finance ordered Abe to use fiscal austerity measures.

The consumption tax hike from 5 to 8 per cent brought about the self-induced recession in 2014, which discouraged Japanese consumers from spending and gave them a signal of further austerity. The tax hike seemed to start permanently damaging the Japanese economy. Japan's GDP contracted by 0.8 per cent in annual terms in the third quarter of 2015, which made Japan go into a technical recession.

Kozo Yamamoto, one of the creators of Abenomics, said that he was shocked by the latest growth figure, and said that the Japanese government should transfer money to those who do not benefit from Abenomics. He argued that it was necessary for the government to adopt an expansionary fiscal policy to lift the economy.

Japan's real GDP shrank at an annualised rate of 1.4 per cent in the October–December quarter of 2015. Consumption, housing investment and exports decreased in the final quarter. Although a revised figure might be significantly different from this figure, it is possible that, in the first quarter of 2016, the Japanese economy will fall into the second recession in Abe administration.

See also

Economy of Japan
Honebuto no hōshin
Laffer curve

Notes

References

External links

 Abenomics must bring seismic change to Japan
 Abenomics false promise

2010s economic history
Economic history of Japan
Economic ideologies
Eponymous economic ideologies
Politics of Japan
Shinzo Abe